Lake Mandrensko or Lake Mandra (Mandrensko ezero) is the southernmost of the Burgas Lakes, located in the immediate proximity of the Black Sea and close to Burgas. Being 8 km long and 1.3 km wide at maximum, as well as having an area of 38.84 km², it was a brackish natural lake until 1963, when it was turned into a reservoir with the construction of a dam to secure fresh water for the large Neftochim Burgas oil refinery. The rivers Izvorska, Fakiyska, Sredetska and Rusokastrenska flow into the lake.

Parts of Lake Mandrensko are designated protected areas, Poda and Uzungeren, inhabited by a number of locally and globally endangered species of fish and birds.

Name and history 
Old names of the lake are Körfes, Ahrenslijsko marsh and Yazekliysko lake. The name Körfes comes from the Turkish körfez and means bay. Under this name the lake was found in 1493, which is an important indication that the lake itself was used as a port.

In 1884, Konstantin Jireček described the lake, 10 km long and 1-2 km wide, as an open estuary with low but constant flow. In summer and autumn, and especially in easterly winds, the salinity increased. According to a report by Prof. Bonchev from 1912, it had an area of 16.5 km2 and was smaller than Lake Burgas. The report also indicates a depth at the Poda canal of 5 meters, while in the western part it reached only 70-80 cm.

In 1963 the dam wall was built, which turned most of the lake into a freshwater dam and increased its area nearly 4 times.

Geography 
The lake is the southernmost and largest of the four Burgas lakes with a water surface area of about 1300 hectares. Its length is 8 km, maximum width 1.3 km. It is located in a well-formed river valley, oriented transversely to the sea shore, as the mouth and the dam wall are in close proximity to the southern end of Bourgas. Four rivers flow into the lake: Izvorska, Fakiyska, Sredetska and Rusokastrenska.

The lake was preserved in its natural state until 1934, when corrections were made to some of the rivers and dikes were built in its western part to prevent spring floods. The second major change in the lake occurred in 1963, with the construction of a dam in its eastern part. In this way, part of the shallows overgrown with swamp vegetation were destroyed, the connection of the lake with the sea was cut off and it became completely freshwater. The large reed massifs disappear, and with them the convenient nesting places for herons, pelicans, ducks, etc. species of waterfowl. In this way the only colony of pink pelicans in Bulgaria was destroyed.

Flora and fauna 
Some parts of the lake have been declared protected areas (part of the mouth of the estuary-protected area "Poda", with an area of 107 ha, the mouth of the river Izvorska - with an area of 151 ha, "Uzungeren" - with an area of 210 ha. The other lakes of the Mandra coast cover the northernmost slopes of Strandzha, with characteristic forest vegetation - cyclamen, wild peony, snowdrop, crocus and others.

The most interesting are the birds on the lake and the shore, where over 250 species have been found. Among them as globally endangered are the little cormorant, the Dalmatian pelican, the red-breasted goose, the thorny-tailed grebe, the meadow woodpecker. The most important nesting place for birds is "Poda", the coastal meadows, the sandy shores - for the blue, the bee-eater, the red angel and others. The winter concentrations of the brown-headed and hooded diver, the song swan and the little swan are the highest in the country and second in terms of the great white-fronted goose and the red-breasted goose. Due to this fact, Mandra is an ornithologically important place of European importance. Of the mammals in the area, otter and squirrel populations are best preserved. Another value of the lake are its fish stocks and waterfowl. A total of 5 species of fish from the Red Book of Bulgaria have been identified in the lake.

Mandrensko
Mandrensko